"Take the Money and Run" is a single by Dutch three-piece girl group O'G3NE. The song was released in the Netherlands as a digital download on 29 April 2016 through BMG as the lead single from their third studio album We Got This (2016). The song peaked at number 130 on the Dutch Singles Chart.

Track listing

Chart performance

Release history

References

2016 songs
2016 singles
O'G3NE songs
BMG Rights Management singles